is a Japanese football manager and former player, who is currently the head coach of Kaya–Iloilo in the Philippines Football League. He played as a midfielder and spent his career in Japan, the United States, Trinidad and Tobago, and the Philippines. He was the player-coach of JP Voltes during the 2016 season of the United Football League.

Career

Youth and college
Hoshide was born in Tokyo, Japan. At age five, he joined the local Takashimadaira Soccer Club. When he was in high school, he moved to Mitsubishi Yowa S.C. He then became an athletic scholar for Meiji University, where he studied political science.

YKK
Hoshide spent eight years with YKK AP (currently known as Kataller Toyama of the J.League) in the third division Japan Football League before coming to the United States in 2008.

Harrisburg City Islanders
Hoshide signed for Harrisburg City Islanders in the USL Second Division. Hoshide played 13 games and scored 1 goal during his year with Harrisburg, before being released at the end of the year.

Northern Virginia Royals
He subsequently signed for Northern Virginia Royals in 2009.

Joe Public
In July 2009, Hoshide joined Joe Public of Trinidad and Tobago's TT Pro League, becoming the first Asian player in the league. While Hoshide became close friends with Fabien Lewis (The former Naparima College defender) who now plies his trade with Real Maryland Monarchs was the one who introduced Hoshide to Inshan Flex Mohammed of the Soca Warriors Online, who in turn assisted him in obtaining a trial with the Eastern Lions. Hoshide was quite impressive on his first trial with the Pro League title chasers and as a result was offered a short-term contract.

His quick thinking and technical ability in midfield proved vital in helping Joe Public capture five titles that included the Big Six, Toyota Classic, Digicel Pro Bowl and the T&T Football Federation FA Trophy last season.

Hoshide also became the first Japanese to take part and score in the CONCACAF Champions League with number 10 on his back.

Global FC
In August 2011, he signed for Filipino side Global F.C., and was immediately assigned as team captain. He made his debut in the 3–2 loss against Stallions in the opening match of the 2011–12 United Football Cup. He captained the Global FC in their 1st UFL Championship since the UFL became a semi-pro league. He won the Agility Award in the awarding ceremony.

JP Voltes
In January 2016,he signed for JP Voltes,a newly promoted team from UFL Division 2 together with his team mates from Global, Masaki Yanagawa and Satoshi Ōtomo.

Managerial career
While Hoshide was still playing with the JP Voltes of UFL Division 2, he also serves as head coach of the club. In 2019, Hoshide was appointed as one of the assistant coaches to Noel Marcaida at Kaya F.C.–Iloilo.

Career statistics

Club
As of 20 June 2013

Continental

Honours

Club
Joe Public
TT Pro League: 2009
Trinidad and Tobago FA Trophy: 2009
Trinidad and Tobago League Cup: 2010; runner-up 2009
Trinidad and Tobago Classic: 2009
TT Pro League Big Six: 2009
Trinidad and Tobago Pro Bowl: 2009
Caribbean Club Championship: runner-up 2010

Global
United Football League: 2012, 2014, 2016
PFF National Men's Club Championship: 2011; runner-up 2013–14, 2014–15
United Football League Cup: 2016; runner-up 2012
United Football League FA League Cup: runner-up 2014
United Football League Football Alliance Cup: 2014

Individual
State Select (Toyama) - All Japan Champion; League Assist King: 2000
Japan Football League All Star - Myanmar/Indonesia Tour: 2003
State Select (Toyama) - All Japan Runner Up: 2003
United Football League Agility Award: 2012

Notes

References

External links
 Yu Hoshide Interview
 SOCCER TRANSITION - Made in Japan

1977 births
Living people
People from Tokyo
Japanese footballers
Japanese expatriate footballers
Association football midfielders
Penn FC players
Northern Virginia Royals players
Joe Public F.C. players
Global Makati F.C. players
TT Pro League players
USL League Two players
USL Second Division players
Expatriate soccer players in the United States
Expatriate footballers in Trinidad and Tobago
Expatriate footballers in the Philippines
JPV Marikina F.C. players